Paul Tapponnier (born 6 January 1947 in Annecy) is a French geologist, specializing in plate tectonics and crustal deformation.

Education and career
Tapponnier graduated in 1970 with an M.S. in geology from the École Nationale Supérieure des Mines de Paris. From 1972 to 1975 he was a research fellow at the Massachusetts Institute of Technology (MIT). He received in 1978 his doctorate from the Université Montpellier-II. He was an associate professor from 1980 to 1985, a full professor from 1986 to 1990, and a full professor with tenure from 1991 to 2009 (and simultaneously, the director of the tectonics department) at the Institut de Physique du Globe de Paris. In 1985 he was a visiting scientist at the Jet Propulsion Laboratory. From January to July 2000, he was a visiting professor at Caltech. Since 2009 he has been a tectonics group leader at the EOS (Earth Observatory of Singapore) of Nanyang Technological University.

Tapponnier was a pioneer in the 1970s in the use of satellite imagery for the study of plate tectonics. Much of his research, often in collaboration in the late 1970s with Peter Molnar, deals with Asian tectonics involving the collision of the Indian Plate with the Eurasian Plate.

Tapponnier has headed several oceanographic research cruises and many field projects in various countries. His research interests include:

Awards and honors
 1984 — Médaille d'argent du CNRS
 1985 — Alfred Wegener Medal
 1990 — Grand prix scientifique de la ville de Paris
 1994 — Fellow of the American Geophysical Union
 1996 — Chevalier de la Légion d'honneur
 2001 — Lyell Medal
 2005 — Member of the French Academy of Sciences (section Sciences de l'univers).
 2005 — Foreign associate member of the National Academy of Sciences

Selected publications

Articles
with P. Molnar: 
with P. Molnar: 
with P. Molnar: 
with P. Molnar: 
with P. Molnar: 
with P. Molnar: 
with G. Peltzer, A. Y. Le Dain, R. Armijo, and P. Cobbold: 
with Jean‐Philippe Avouac: 
with V. Courtillot, C. Jaupart, I. Manighetti, and J. Besse: 
with Xu Zhiqin, Françoise Roger, Bertrand Meyer, Nicolas Arnaud, Gérard Wittlinger, and Yang Jingsui:

Books
with Kevin Kling:

References

External links

1947 births
Living people
French geologists
Mines Paris - PSL alumni
University of Montpellier alumni
Lyell Medal winners
Members of the French Academy of Sciences
Foreign associates of the National Academy of Sciences